The YWCA-Rolling Bay route was a shipping route that originated from Seattle, Washington.  The route included stops on the east side of Bainbridge Island, Washington at the YWCA summer camp (a Boy Scout camp and a riding camp were also located nearby) and at  Rolling Bay.

As of January 1, 1917, the Kitsap County Transportation Company was operating steamboats on the route.

Notes

References
 Public Service Commission of Washington, Complainant, v. Kitsap County Transportation Company, Respondent, Case No. 4274, published in State of Washington, Public Service Commission, Annual Report (1916), at page 150 (accessed 06-04-11)]
 Federal Writers Project, Washington – A Guide to the Evergreen State (1935) (accessed 06-05-11)

Steamship routes in Washington (state)
History of Kitsap County, Washington